L'Escarène is an ancient commune in the Alpes-Maritimes department in southeastern France. It was part of the historic County of Nice until 1860, named Scarena. It was a main stop along the Route de Sel during the 14th, 15th and 16th centuries, between French Provence and Italian Piedmont, on the Nice-Turin road. It was built in the bottom of the valley of Spangle of Escarène at the confluence of the streams of Redebraus and Paillon.

More than half of its territory is made up of pine and oak, with marked trails for easy walks and hikes.

This commune is known for a sad case of racist group lynching, in which a 39-year-old father was killed in 2022.

Transport
 Train: the town is served by the line from Nice to Breil-sur-Roya.
 Road The Departmental road 2204 passes through the town.

Borders
Northwest = Lucéram
North = Touët-de-l'Escarène
Northeast = Peille
East = Peille
Southeast = Peille
South = Blausasc
Southwest = Berre-les-Alpes
West = Berre-les-Alpes

Toponymy
The name of the town comes from the ancient Occitan and Franco-Provençal 'scarenna', a common name in the Alps and the wider Southeast (l'Escarène, Echarenne, Echerenne, Eycherennes, Eysserennes, Echirène, Echarasson, Chérennes, etc.). The word derives from the Latin 'scala', "scale", with classic passage of the intervocalic in 'r'. In place names, it refers to the edge, the steepest part of the mountain which can be reached by degrees as of a ladder.

In Occitan Nice, the name of the town is L'Escarène according to classical norm and standard Mistralian. The inhabitants are called Escarénois. Scarena was the official Italian name of the municipality in 1814 and 1860.

History
The village is cited in history since the eleventh century. In 1037 there was a St. Peter's Church in L'Escarène. The stronghold of 'Lescarena' 'or' 'Scarena' 'belonged to the Saint-Pons Abbey, Nice.

A castle was built there in the first half of the thirteenth century, but was destroyed in 1252. The first houses were built in the late thirteenth century. The oldest known house is' 'the Maioun de Pie' at Safranier. It has no doors or windows; entry is gained thru the roof via ladder.

In 1520 the village was detached from the municipality of Peille. The lordship of the town belonged to a Nice consul family, Tonduti, who bore the title of Count of L'Escarène. Until 1570, the village developed on the slopes of Mount Pifourchier.

The development of the Salt Road between Nice and Piedmont by L'Escarène, Lucéram, Lantosque and Vésubie Valley connected the town to the outside world. The construction of the Royal Road (Nice-Turin) by the Col di Tenda will increase the importance of the city as a stopping point.

An earthquake damaged the region on 23 February 1887. On 30 October 1928, the railway line from Nice to Breil-sur-Roya was inaugurated.

List of mayors
1861–1865 Octave Deleuse
1865–1870 Louis Arnulf
1870–1871 Henri Rostagni
1871–1874 Jean-Baptiste Cauvin
1874–1876 Augustin Faraut
1876–1884 Louis Arnulf
1884–1885 Pierre Pasquier
1885–1886 Romulus Arnulf
1886–1890 Louis Arnulf
1890–1894 François Alardi
1894–1896 Henri Fulconis
1896–1906 Thérésius Bianchi
1906–1908 Henri Fulconis
1908–1912 Jules Sioly
1912–1919 André Bianchi
1919–1940 Paul Roux
1944–1947 Xavier Faraut
1947–1957 Louis Blancart
1957–1962 Paul Roux
1962–1976 Godéart Pachiaudi
1976–1980 José Martel
1980–2001 Gilbert Cardon
2001–
2008–current Pierre Donadey

Cultural events
In 1991 the Ancient Music Festival l'Escarène and Paillon was initiated. This event has gained national renown..

Since 2000, the "Appointment of the Organ Alive" is organized every summer to showcase the organ-making history of the Grinda brothers. Several organ recitals are programmed in the months of August and September with prestigious organists.

Places and monuments
 The church Saint-Pierre-ès-Liens and its listed historical organ, built by the Grinda brothers in 1791
 The White Penitents chapel
 The Chapel of the Black Penitents
 The oil mill and its museum
 The Old Bridge
 The area of Serre
 The war memorial
 The mausoleum
 The  lavoirs
 The chapel Saint-Roch
 The chapel Saint -Pancrace
 The nature trail ScarénaBerra
 The Aiga park

Population

See also
Communes of the Alpes-Maritimes department

References

Communes of Alpes-Maritimes
Alpes-Maritimes communes articles needing translation from French Wikipedia